Irati Formation is the name of a geological formation of the Paraná Basin in Brazil. It has previously been dated as Late Permian using palynomorphs, but is now dated as Early Permian using zircon ages obtained from bentonite layers. The base of the formation has been dated at 278.4 ± 2.2 Ma. Exposures of the Irati Formation are to be found in the South (Geopark of Paleorrota), southeastern Brazil and in the states of Goiás, Mato Grosso, São Paulo, Paraná, Santa Catarina, Rio Grande do Sul and Mato Grosso do Sul. The formation is part of the Passa Dios Group, underlying the Serra Alta Formation and overlying the Palermo Formation. The formation has been deposited in a restricted marine environment.

Fossil content 
The formation is particularly famous for the occurrences of the mesosaurs Mesosaurus tenuidiens, and Stereosternum tumidum. Other fossils found in the formation are Myelontordoxylon camposii, and crustaceans of the genera Paulocaris, Pygaspis, Liocaris, and Clarkecaris. It is considered time equivalent to the Whitehill Formation of the Ecca Group of the Karoo Supergroup of southern Africa and the Mangrullo Formation of Uruguay.

See also 
 
 
 Ganigobis Formation

References

Bibliography 
 
 
 
 

Geologic formations of Brazil
Formations
Permian System of South America
Cisuralian Series
Permian Brazil
Shale formations
Sandstone formations
Oil shale formations
Oil shale in Brazil
Permian southern paleotemperate deposits
Formations
Formations
Formations
Formations
Formations
Formations
Formations